Alejandro "Álex" Robles García (born 28 January 1999) is a Spanish footballer who doesn’t have team, and plays as a right back.

Club career
Born in Pizarra, Málaga, Andalusia, Robles was a Málaga CF youth graduate. He made his senior debut with the B-team on 28 August 2016, starting in a 1–0 Tercera División home win against UD Ciudad de Torredonjimeno.

On 4 September 2017, after playing the whole pre-season with the main squad, Robles extended his contract until 2020. On 24 October, he made his professional debut by starting in a 1–2 away win against CD Numancia for the season's Copa del Rey. His La Liga debut occurred the following 19 May, as he started in a 0–1 home loss against Getafe CF.

On 14 August 2019, as Málaga's financial crisis worsened, Robles moved to another reserve team, Sevilla Atlético in Segunda División B.

References

External links

1999 births
Living people
Sportspeople from the Province of Málaga
Spanish footballers
Footballers from Andalusia
Association football defenders
La Liga players
Segunda División B players
Tercera División players
Atlético Malagueño players
Málaga CF players
Sevilla Atlético players
Córdoba CF players
Spain youth international footballers